Harvey Andrew Knibbs (born 26 April 1999) is an English professional footballer who plays for League One club Cambridge United.

Knibbs was raised in Derbyshire and joined the Nottingham Forest academy as a child before moving to the Aston Villa Academy. He signed his first professional contract at the end of the 2016–17 season. In June 2019 Knibbs signed a two-year contract with Cambridge United. On debut for Cambridge Knibbs scored the winning penalty as Championship side Brentford were defeated in the EFL Cup.

Personal life
Knibbs' brother is international athlete Alex Knibbs, who won a bronze medal in the 4 × 400 m relay at the IAAF U20 World Championships. Knibbs' dad, Ralph Knibbs is a former elite rugby union player for Bristol.

Career statistics

References

External links
 

Living people
1999 births
Footballers from Derbyshire
Association football forwards
Aston Villa F.C. players
Cambridge United F.C. players
English Football League players
English footballers